The Unwritten Law is a 1932 American pre-Code mystery film directed by Christy Cabanne and starring Greta Nissen, Richard "Skeets" Gallagher, and Mary Brian. It was released on November 15, 1932.

Cast list
 Greta Nissen as Fifi La Rue
 Richard "Skeets" Gallagher as Pete Brown
 Mary Brian as Ruth Evans
 Louise Fazenda as Lulu Potts
 Lew Cody as Roger Morgan
 Hedda Hopper as Jean Evans
 Purnell Pratt as Stephen McBain
 Theodore Von Eltz as Val Lewis
 Mischa Auer as Abu Zeyd
 Arthur Rankin as Frank Woods

References

Bibliography
 Wollstein, Hans J. . Strangers in Hollywood: the History of Scandinavian Actors in American Films from 1910 to World War II. Scarecrow Press, 1994.

External links 
 
 
 

Majestic Pictures films
Films directed by Christy Cabanne
American mystery films
American black-and-white films
1932 mystery films
1930s American films
1930s English-language films